Angophora paludosa is a tree species that is native to eastern Australia.

Angophora paludosa is now regarded as a synonym of A. bakeri subsp. bakeri by the Australian Plant Census.

References

paludosa
Flora of New South Wales
Trees of Australia
Taxa named by Kevin Thiele
Plants described in 1988